Richard Wiley (born November 19, 1944) is an American novelist and short story writer whose first novel, Soldiers in Hiding won the 1987 PEN/Faulkner Award for Fiction. He has published five other novels and a number of short stories (see "Works" below).

Wiley holds a B.A. from the University of Puget Sound and an M.A. from Sophia University in Tokyo; he earned his MFA in creative writing from the Iowa Writers' Workshop, where he studied under John Irving. Since 1989 he has been a professor of English at the University of Nevada, Las Vegas. Wiley is professor emeritus of English and a board member of Black Mountain Institute at the University of Nevada, Las Vegas. Wiley was a member of the UNLV English Department faculty from 1989 to 2015 and cofounded UNLV's graduate Creative Writing Program.

He was inducted into the Nevada Writers Hall of Fame in 2005.

Works
Soldiers in Hiding. Boston: Atlantic Monthly P, 1986. 
Fools' Gold. New York: Knopf, 1988.   
Festival for Three Thousand Maidens. New York: Dutton, 1991. 
Indigo. New York: Dutton, 1992. 
Ahmed's Revenge. New York: Random House, 1998. 
Commodore Perry's Minstrel Show. Austin: U of Texas P, 2007.  
The Book of Important Moments. Dzanc, 2013. 
Tacoma Stories. Bellevue Literary Press, 2019.

References

1944 births
Living people
20th-century American novelists
21st-century American novelists
American male novelists
PEN/Faulkner Award for Fiction winners
American male short story writers
20th-century American short story writers
21st-century American short story writers
20th-century American male writers
21st-century American male writers
Peace Corps volunteers